This list presents female speakers of national and territorial lower houses of their respective countries or territories. The lower house is one of two chambers in a bicameral legislature. The lower house has more power than the upper house. It usually has the power to impeach the executive in presidential republics or remove the prime minister in semi-presidential republics. Its members are elected by popular votes, compared to the upper house members who are usually appointed.

National

Territorial

See also
Bicameralism
List of current presidents of legislatures
List of legislatures by country
Lower House
Parliament
Speaker (politics)

Speakers, Lower house
Speakers, Lower house
Speakers, Lower house
Female